"Cherry Pie" is a song by the American glam metal band Warrant. It was released in September 1990, as the lead single from the album of the same name. It preceded the album's release by three days. The song became a Top Ten hit on the Billboard Hot 100, reaching number 10 and also reached number 19 on the Mainstream Rock Tracks. The song has been cited by many as a "hair metal" anthem.

Background and writing
"Cherry Pie" was a very late inclusion on the band's second album, originally the album was going to be called Uncle Tom's Cabin. The president of Columbia Records, Don Ienner, wanted a rock anthem, so he called frontman Jani Lane (according to Lane, he wanted a song reminiscent of Aerosmith's "Love in an Elevator"), who wrote the song in about fifteen minutes. Allen stated that "the whole marketing and everything for that record changed. It was definitely driven by the label and not the band." The song, which was inspired by Def Leppard's "Pour Some Sugar on Me," which interestingly was also a last-minute addition to that group's Hysteria album, was written down on a pizza box, which is now on display in the Hard Rock Cafe in Destin, Florida, part of the Destin Commons. The guitar solo was played by C.C. DeVille as a favor to Lane, who was a long-time friend.

Many of the band members felt that "Cherry Pie" was not one of the better songs on the album, and see the song as a double-edged sword: it brought them fame, but many of their other songs are overshadowed by the major hit. On VH1's HEAVY: The Story Of Metal episode 3: "Looks That Kill," Lane expressed his regret for writing the song, stating that "I could shoot myself in the fucking head for writing that song." However, he later clarified that he had been under personal stress at the time of the VH1 interview, and had no ill feelings towards his association with the song:

Music video
The video for "Cherry Pie" received heavy airplay on MTV and other music video stations. It featured the members of Warrant and a scantily clad woman (model Bobbie Brown) who is seen dancing throughout the video while the band members perform and make tongue-in-cheek references to the song's lyrics (for example, when the line referencing baseball is sung, Brown appears in a form-fitting baseball uniform, complete with a bat), all against a white background.

Canadian cable-TV music network, MuchMusic refused to air the "Cherry Pie" video on the grounds that it was "offensively sexist". Director Jeff Stein defended the video saying it was a parody: "It's so over-the-top, how could anyone think it was anything but a spoof of other hair-metal videos, you know? If people think it was sexist, it was only sexist as a parody of sexism."

Brown became involved with Lane soon after the video was filmed, and married him in 1991.

Howard Johnson writing for Classic Rock ranked the song's video at No. 3 on their list of The Top 10 Best Hair Metal Videos.

Alternate versions 
"Cherry Pie" was re-visited by the band in 1999 on their Greatest & Latest album and was released as a promo and later iTunes single and was also released on several mixed compilation albums. In 2004, Lane recorded an acoustic version of "Cherry Pie", which featured on the second VH1 Classic Metal Mania: Stripped compilation. An electronic remix of "Cherry Pie" was released in 2015 by Lack Jemmon.

Charts

Certifications

References 

1990 singles
1990 songs
Columbia Records singles
Songs written by Jani Lane
Warrant (American band) songs